The Government of Lithuania, officially the Government of the Republic of Lithuania (Lietuvos Respublikos Vyriausybė, abbreviated LRV), is the cabinet of Lithuania,  exercising executive power in the country. Among other responsibilities, it executes laws and resolutions of the parliament, the Seimas, and the decrees of the President, manages state property and, together with the president, executes the foreign policy of the country. The Government also has the right of legislative initiative, puts together the state budget and presents it to the Seimas for approval.

The Government consists of the prime minister, who is the head of government, and 14 government ministers.

The prime minister is appointed by the president, with the assent of the Seimas. The prime minister then forms the rest of the cabinet, with the assent of the president, and the Government and its programme are subject to approval by the Seimas.

The current Government started work in December 2020 and is headed by Ingrida Šimonytė as the prime minister. The government is based on a coalition of the Homeland Union-Lithuanian Christian Democrats (TS-LKD), Liberal Movement (LRLS), and Freedom Party (LP).

Government mandate 
The Government of the Republic of Lithuania exercises executive power in Lithuania. The powers of the Government are defined by the Constitution and laws of Lithuania.

The Government has the responsibility to administer the affairs of the country, ensure its security and public order. It executes laws and resolutions of the Seimas as well as the decrees of the president. The government coordinates the activities of the ministries and other subordinate institutions, establishes, abolishes and controls government agencies, and submits proposals to the Seimas to establish and abolish ministries. The government disposes of the property of the state and establishes procedures for its management and use.

The Government, along with the Seimas and the president, has the right of legislative initiative in Lithuania. The government prepares draft laws and presents them to the Seimas for consideration. The government also prepares a draft budget and submits it to the Seimas. The Government executes the budget approved by the Seimas.

In foreign affairs, the government establishes diplomatic ties and maintains relations with foreign states and international organizations. The Government shares the responsibility for managing the foreign affairs of the country with the president. The Government proposes and the president approves Lithuania's diplomatic representatives to foreign states and international institutions.

In local government, the Government appoints representatives to the municipalities to monitor whether the municipalities comply with the Constitution and laws of Lithuania and the orders of the Government.

The prime minister is appointed by the president, with the assent of the Seimas. Likewise, the ministers are proposed by the prime minister and appointed by the president. Within 15 days of the appointment, the prime minister presents the Government and its programme to the Seimas for consideration. The Government receives its mandate after the Seimas gives assent to its programme in a majority vote.

The Government is responsible to the Seimas for its activities. Likewise, the ministers are responsible to the Seimas and the president. The Government presents to the Seimas an annual report on its activities and reports to the Seimas on the execution of the budget. Upon the request of the Seimas, the Government or individual ministers must give an account of their activities. The Government is also obliged to inform the public about their activities through the internet and other media, or through meetings with the people.

The Government returns its mandate to the president after the Seimas elections or the elections of the president, or upon the resignation of the Government. The return of the mandate after the elections of the president is largely ceremonial and allows the newly elected head of state to verify that the Government still has the confidence of the Seimas. The Government is obliged to resign when the Seimas twice declines to give its assent to the programme of the newly formed Government, when the Seimas, in a majority secret ballot, expresses no-confidence in the Government or the prime minister, when the prime minister resigns or dies, or when a new government is formed after the elections to the Seimas. If the Seimas expresses no-confidence in the Government, the Government may propose to the president to hold a new election to the Seimas.

The president of Lithuania accepts the resignation of individual ministers. Ministers must resign when the Seimas, in a majority secret ballot, express no-confidence in them. When more than half of the ministers are changed, the Government must seek a renewed mandate from the Seimas or resign.

Structure 
The government of the Republic of Lithuania consists of the prime minister and the ministers. The prime minister represents the Government and heads its activities. When the prime minister is not available or unable to hold office, the president may charge one of the ministers to substitute for the prime minister for no more than 60 days.

A minister heads his respective ministry, resolving issues belonging to the competence area of the ministry and discharging other functions provided for by law. Ministers act directly subordinate to the prime minister. Another member of the Government, appointed by the prime minister, may temporarily substitute for a Minister.

Ministries 
Ministries are the structures that allow the ministers to manage the fields assigned to them. Ministries are established as public legal persons and are financed from the state budget.

There are 14 ministries in Lithuania:

Institutions under the Government 
Government agencies are established to participate in the shaping of a policy and to implement such policy. Government agencies are public legal bodies financed from the state budget.

Government agencies and institutions accountable to the government are:
 Civil Service Department
 Department of Physical Education and Sports
 Office of the Chief Archivist of Lithuania
 State Data Protection Inspectorate
 Drug, Tobacco and Alcohol Control Department
 Department of Statistics
 State Food and Veterinary Service
 Commission on Tax Disputes
 State Enterprise Turto Bankas
 State Nuclear Power Safety Inspectorate
 The Chief Administrative Disputes Commission
 The Communications Regulatory Authority
 Public Procurement Office

Government operations 

The Government resolves the affairs of state at its sittings by adopting resolutions by majority vote of all the members of the Government. The Auditor General may also participate in the sittings of the Government. Minutes are taken and audio recordings are made of Government sittings, however, the government sittings have not been universally publicly broadcast.

A Government resolution adopted in a sitting is signed by the prime minister and the Minister of the corresponding branch of the Government.

The prime minister and the ministers are also entitled to attend the sittings of the Seimas, its Committees, Commissions and parliamentary groups, and to convey their opinion on the issues under consideration.

The prime minister and the ministers may not hold any other offices (except being members of the Seimas), may not be employed in business, commercial and other private establishments or enterprises, and may not receive any remuneration other than the salary for their respective Government offices. The members of the Government can, however, receive remuneration for creative activities.

The Office of the Government supports the Government in performing Government's and Prime Minister's functions. The Office of the Government is headed by the Chancellor of the Government. Giedrė Balčytytė has served as the Chancellor since December 2020.

Current government 

In November 24, 2020 Ingrida Šimonytė was appointed the prime minister of the 18th government of the Republic of Lithuania since the restoration of independence in 1990. The Government was formed after the elections to Seimas in October 2020 and the subsequent coalition agreement between the Homeland Union-Lithuanian Christian Democrats (TS-LKD), Liberal Movement (LRLS), and Freedom Party (LP).

The 18th cabinet of Lithuania was approved by the President of Lithuania on December 7, 2020. The approval of the Government Program and the swearing-in of the Government in the Parliament of Lithuania was held on December 11, 2020.

The following ministers are members of the Šimonytė Cabinet:

Previous governments 

The current government of Lithuania is the 18th since the restoration of independence on 11 March 1990.

Kazimiera Prunskienė became the first Prime Minister of newly independent Lithuania, appointed by the Supreme Council on 17 March 1990, although the law governing the mandate of the government was only adopted on the 22 March. Her government resigned less than a year later and was followed by those of Albertas Šimėnas, Gediminas Vagnorius, Aleksandras Abišala. These early governments were primarily occupied with ensuring the diplomatic recognition and economic support for the new country and managing tensions with the Soviet Union.

Following the first election to the Seimas, Democratic Labor Party of Lithuania formed the government headed by Bronislovas Lubys, a prominent industrialist, who headed the government until the first presidential election and was followed by Adolfas Šleževičius. His government was mainly preoccupied with ensuring the monetary stability of the country, following years of high inflation. Šleževičius was forced to resign in February 1996, amid a row regarding a deposit he had withdrawn from a local bank just days before its collapse. Laurynas Stankevičius was appointed in his stead.

The 1996 parliamentary election was won by the Homeland Union. The government was formed by the Homeland Union and Lithuanian Christian Democrats, with Gediminas Vagnorius appointed as the prime minister for the second time. In spring 2009, the Government survived the vote of no-confidence in the Seimas, but resigned shortly thereafter, with the popular then-mayor of Vilnius Rolandas Paksas appointed to the post of Prime Minister. His government lasted only 5 months, before he publicly renounced and refused to sign the privatization agreement for Mazeikiu Nafta oil refinery, resigning as a result. Andrius Kubilius served as the prime minister from November 1999 until the next election to Seimas in October 2000.

The election resulted in Rolandas Paksas, now part of Liberal Union of Lithuania, serving as the prime minister for the second time. His government, formed together with New Union (Social Liberals), lasted only seven months before being brought down by disagreements within the coalition. New Union then joined the Government together with Social Democratic Party of Lithuania, with former president Algirdas Brazauskas as the prime minister.

Algirdas Brazauskas became the first Prime Minister of Lithuania to remain in power after the election to Seimas in 2004, forming the minority 13th Government with New Union and Labour Party. The Government resigned in May 2006, citing difficulties in working with the opposition. Gediminas Kirkilas served as the prime minister until the next election to the Seimas in 2008.

The coalition of Homeland Union, Liberal Movement, Liberal and Centre Union and the short-lived National Resurrection Party formed the 15th government of Lithuania, with Andrius Kubilius as the prime minister for the second time. Despite the deep economic crisis and taking unpopular decisions, his Government became the first Lithuanian government to last the full term of the parliament.

See also
 Elections in Lithuania
 List of governments of Lithuania (since 1990)
 List of governments of Lithuania (1918–1940)

References

External links 
Official website of the government of the Republic of Lithuania (English version) 

 
 
European governments